Spoiler Alert is a 2022 American biographical romantic drama film starring Jim Parsons and Ben Aldridge as two lovers, one who watches the other's final months before his death from terminal cancer. The film, based on the 2017 memoir Spoiler Alert: The Hero Dies by Michael Ausiello, is directed by Michael Showalter and written by David Marshall Grant and Dan Savage. Parsons plays Ausiello, and Aldridge plays his lover Kit Cowan who dies of cancer.

Spoiler Alert was released in the United States on December 2, 2022, by Focus Features.

Plot 
The film opens with Kit Cowan dying in the arms of his husband, Michael Ausiello, following his 11-month battle with terminal cancer. The story, told through Michael, details their 14-year relationship leading up to Kit's death.

In 2001, Michael, a writer for TV Guide, is brought to a gay nightclub by his best friend in Manhattan. There, he meets Kit, a photographer, and the two instantly connect. As they begin dating, Michael struggles with his insecurities of not being attractive enough for Kit, previously being overweight. Kit reveals that he had an affair with a man at the gym. They both admit their fears of being in a long-term relationship since neither of them had been in one before, but they decide to continue dating each other. During their first Christmas together, Kit gives Michael his own closet space at his apartment, inviting Michael to live with him.  

In 2002, Kit gets an appendectomy. His parents, Bob and Marilyn, come to Manhattan. Not out to them, Kit asks Michael to "clean" the apartment of anything gay and all evidence of their relationship. Upon returning to Kit's place, Marilyn grows suspicious of Michael. After she incessantly interrogates the two men, Kit comes out to his parents and reveals that Michael is his boyfriend. While initially upset that Kit could not admit this to her, Marilyn is accepting and welcomes Michael. Michael and Kit continue their relationship and get a townhouse together. During their second Christmas, Michael invites Kit to lie under the Christmas tree with him as he did when he was a child and explains it was always a fantasy of his to do it every year with his partner.

In 2013, Michael and Kit develop complications in their relationship as their sex life deteriorates. Michael spends too much time with his company TVLine and becomes an alcoholic; Michael suspects Kit is having an affair with his coworker, Sebastian. Their therapist believes they now resent each other but still love each other too much to end it, and suggests that they separate to reassess their feelings. Kit moves out, but the two remain in their relationship. During their thirteenth Christmas, Kit begins showing signs of ill health. 

In 2014, Kit is diagnosed with a rare form of stage-4 neuroendocrine cancer. Michael, still traumatized by his mother's death from cancer, lets Kit move back in and the two reconcile. Michael supports Kit as he undergoes a chemo and radiation therapy. Kit's health worsens and the oncologist reveals that he has six weeks left to live. Michael apologizes to Kit for not letting him know how beautiful he was due to his fears of being left for a more attractive man. Kit apologizes to Michael for having an affair with Sebastian. Kit proposes to Michael and they marry the next day. Michael and Kit spend their last Christmas together, during which Michael fantasizes himself and Kit growing old and lying under the Christmas tree.

In 2015, Kit is taken to the hospital. Nearing death, Michael allows Sebastian to say goodbye to Kit. As Kit is dying, Michael fantasizes of interviewing Kit as a departing actor whose character is being killed off a television show. Kit expresses gratitude for his time on the show and is looking forward to the future. Michael asks Kit what he should do, and Kit assures him that he will figure it out. Back in reality, Michael thanks Kit for giving him a family and tells him it is okay to go. After Kit's death, Michael continues to be a part of Bob and Marilyn's lives. Michael prepares to leave New York for Los Angeles. As he's nervous to start his new journey, he remembers how brave he was to begin his adventure with Kit.

Cast
 Jim Parsons as Michael Ausiello
 Ben Aldridge as Kit Cowan
 Sally Field as Marilyn Cowan
 Bill Irwin as Bob
 Antoni Porowski as Sebastian
 Nikki M. James as Nina
 Jeffery Self as Nick
 Tara Summers as Mrs. Ausiello
 Shunori Ramanathan as Dr. Lucas
 Paco Lozano as Judge

Production
Production began in December 2018, when Jim Parsons signed on to produce and star in the film and Michael Showalter signed on to direct it. In July 2021, Ben Aldridge was cast as Kit Cowan. In September 2021, Sally Field joined the cast playing Kit's mother, Marilyn. Principal photography began in the fall in New York City.

Release
The film was released for a limited release by Focus Features on December 2, 2022, before releasing across the United States a week later on December 9, 2022.

Home media
Spoiler Alert was released for VOD on December 20, 2022, followed by a Blu-ray and DVD release on February 7, 2023.

Reception

Box office 
The film made $679,690 from 789 theaters in its opening wide weekend, finishing in 10th.

Critical response 
On Rotten Tomatoes, the film holds an approval rating of 85% based on 87 reviews, with an average rating of 6.7/10. The website's consensus reads, "It can be frustratingly uneven, but strong performances from a talented cast help Spoiler Alert stay on the right side of saccharine." On Metacritic, the film has a score of 61 out of 100 based on 22 reviews, indicating "generally favorable reviews". PostTrak reported 91% of audience members gave the film a positive score.

Accolades

See also

 Bros
 Fire Island
 LGBT culture in New York City
 List of LGBT people from New York City
 Pose

References

External links
 

2022 biographical drama films
2022 LGBT-related films
2022 romantic drama films
2020s American films
2020s English-language films
American biographical drama films
American LGBT-related films
American romantic drama films
Biographical films about LGBT people
Dan Savage
Films about cancer in the United States
Films based on memoirs
Focus Features films
Gay-related films
LGBT-related romantic drama films
Romance films based on actual events